Billy Russell Kinard (December 16, 1933 – June 30, 2018) was an American football player and coach. He played professionally as a defensive back for the Cleveland Browns and Green Bay Packers of the National Football League (NFL) and the Buffalo Bills of the American Football League (AFL). Kinard played college football at the University of Mississippi (Ole Miss) before being drafted by the Cleveland Browns in the second round of the 1956 NFL Draft. He played professionally for four seasons and retired in 1960. Kinard later served as the head football coach at Ole Miss from 1971 to 1973 and at Gardner–Webb University in 1978, compiling a career coaching record of 20–14–1.

Coaching career
In 1970, Kinard's older brother, a former Ole Miss and NFL star, Frank "Bruiser" Kinard, became the athletic director at Ole Miss. He hired the younger Kinard to be the new Ole Miss Rebels football coach.   Billy Kinard was the head coach when Ole Miss football became integrated.  It was said that Johnny Vaught had swore to never integrate the football team.  So, Billy was brought in to specifically do this.  After the third contest of the 1973 season, Johnny Vaught replaced Kinard, returning for his second stint as Ole Miss' athletic director and head football coach.

Head coaching record

See also
 List of American Football League players

Notes

References

External links
 
 

1933 births
2018 deaths
American football defensive backs
American football halfbacks
Arkansas Razorbacks football coaches
American Football League players
Auburn Tigers football coaches
Buffalo Bills players
Cleveland Browns coaches
Cleveland Browns players
Florida Gators football coaches
Gardner–Webb Runnin' Bulldogs football coaches
Georgia Bulldogs football coaches
Green Bay Packers coaches
Green Bay Packers players
New England Patriots coaches
Ole Miss Rebels football coaches
Ole Miss Rebels football players
High school football coaches in Florida
Sportspeople from Jackson, Mississippi
Players of American football from Jackson, Mississippi